Maharaj Shri Ranvirsinhji (7 October 1919 – 4 April 1962), a member of the Jamnagar royal family, played first-class cricket in India from 1936 to 1952. He toured Australia with the Indian team in 1947-48 but did not play Test cricket.

Ranvirsinhji made his first-class debut in 1936–37 at the age of 17, and played in the Nawanagar team that won the Ranji Trophy final a few months later, along with his brother Indravijaysinhji and their cousin Yadvendrasinhji. In 1937-38 he made his highest score, 53, opening the batting for Nawanagar in an innings victory over Sind.

He made 31 (top score) and 43 and took 6 for 84 when Nawanagar lost by an innings to Bombay in the Ranji Trophy in 1946–47. But overall, in three matches in 1946-47 he scored only 137 runs at an average of 27.40, and he was a surprise late inclusion in the Indian team that toured Australia in 1947-48. In his first match of the tour, against New South Wales, he was injured when a ball from Ray Lindwall struck him on the knee. Later on the tour he had trouble with his eyes, and a specialist in Melbourne had a pair of spectacles made for him. He played only two first-class matches and was the only member of the 17-man team who did not play any of the Tests.

After the tour he did not play first-class cricket until 1950–51, when he returned to play for two unsuccessful seasons with Services.

His son Prahlad Singh played five matches for Saurashtra from 1958 to 1967.

Family tree

References

External links
 Ranvirsinhji at CricketArchive

1919 births
1962 deaths
Indian cricketers
Nawanagar cricketers
People from Jamnagar
Services cricketers
Cricketers from Gujarat